Bulgarians in the United Kingdom include citizens of the United Kingdom who trace their Bulgarian ancestry. The number of Bulgarian-born people resident in the UK has risen from 5,351 at the time of the 2001 Census to an estimated 103,000 in 2018.

Since 1 January 2014, Bulgarians have freedom of movement and work in the United Kingdom as citizens of the European Union.

History
A true Bulgarian community in the United Kingdom was formed relatively recently as compared to Bulgarian communities in other countries in Western Europe. Few Bulgarian students enrolled at British universities before World War II; political and economic emigration was also scarce. It was only around 1944–1945 that a more apparent circle of Bulgarian political emigrants was formed in the United Kingdom.

During the Cold War, when Bulgaria was a socialist state known as the People's Republic of Bulgaria (1944–1989), the Bulgarian community in the United Kingdom numbered some 3,000–4,000, mostly in England. Emigration to the United Kingdom was very active in the 1990s and 2000s. By 2000, the Bulgarian community numbered over 10,000 according to unofficial data. Other estimates from the early 21st century claim over 30,000 Bulgarians live permanently or temporarily (as students and workers) in the capital London alone. The 2001 UK Census recorded 5,351 people born in Bulgaria.

When Bulgaria joined the European Union in January 2007, the British government placed transitional restrictions on the rights of Bulgarians to move to the UK, which were subsequently extended and these transitional restrictions expired on 1 January 2014. The Office for National Statistics estimates that 69,000 Bulgarian-born immigrants were resident in the UK in 2015. By 2018, this estimate had risen to 103,000.

Notable people
 Elizaveta Karamihailova, physicist
 Dobrinka Tabakova, composer
 Paul Dickov (b. 1972), Scottish footballer
 Boncho Genchev (b. 1964), footballer, first Bulgarian in the Premier League, currently residing in London
 Stanislav Ianevski (b. 1985), actor
 Georgi Markov (1929–1978), dissident writer
 Gerri Peev, journalist
 Silvena Rowe, chef
 Dimitar Berbatov (b. 1981) (footballer) former Tottenham Hotspur, Manchester United and Fulham player

See also

 Bulgarian diaspora
 London Bulgarian Choir
 Bulgaria–United Kingdom relations

References

Ivancheva, M. 2007. Strawberry Fields Forever?  Bulgarian and Romanian student workers in the UK. – Focaal – European Journal of Anthropology, 49 (2007), pp. 110–117 
 Maeva, M. Organizations and Institutions of Bulgarian Emigration in the United Kingdom – In: Karamihova, M. (ed.). European dimensions of Culture and History on the Balkans. Sofia: Paradigma, 2010, pp. 276–291  
 Maeva, M Memories for Socialism into the Internet Forum of Bulgarian Emigrants in the United Kingdom – In: Wilson, P., P. McEntaggart. Navigating Landscapes of Mediated Memory. Oxford, Interdisciplinary Press, 2011, pp. 29–38  (https://web.archive.org/web/20130821114416/https://www.interdisciplinarypress.net/online-store/ebooks/digital-humanities/navigating-landscapes-of-mediated-memory).  
 Maeva, M. Internet and Bulgarian Emigration to and in the Great Britain - Ethnologia Balkanica, 2011, vol. 15, publishing by International Association for Southeast European History (InASEA), Munich, pp. 349–362  
 Maeva, M. Language as a Border: the Case of Bulgarian Emigrants in the UK – In: Hirstov, P (ed.). Migration and identity: Historical, Cultural and Linguistic Dimensions of Mobility on the Balkans. Sofia, Paradigma, 2012, 312-325  
 Valkanova, Yordanka. 2009. Being a Rara Avis: Education Experiences of Bulgarian Children in Schools in London - In: Eade, John, Yordanka Valkanova (eds.) Accession and Migration: Changing Policy, Society and Culture in an Enlarged Europe. Surrey: Ashgate Publishing, pp. 133–142

External links 
  London Bulgarian Choir
  Bulgarian Party London 
 Bulgarian London
 BG London — Bulgarian Newspaper London, UK

 
United Kingdom
Immigration to the United Kingdom by country of origin